Richard John Feehan (born February 11, 1960) is a Canadian politician who was elected in the 2015 Alberta general election to the Legislative Assembly of Alberta representing the electoral district of Edmonton-Rutherford. He was made Alberta NDP caucus chair on June 3 and elected deputy chairman of committees on June 12, 2015.

Biography, education, and career before politics
Richard Feehan was born into an Irish-Catholic family on February 11, 1960, to Bernie and Kathleen Feehan. His father was a Judge on the Court of Queen’s Bench of Alberta and his mother was chair of Grant MacEwan’s social work program for 30 years.  Feehan has six siblings working in law, academia, psychology, education and social work. He is married with three adult children.

Feehan graduated from St. Francis Xavier High School in 1977. He earned a Bachelor of Arts degree in 1980 from the University of Alberta, a Bachelor of Social Work degree from the University of Calgary in 1982, and a Masters of Social Work degree from Wilfrid Laurier University in 1986.

His work experience before politics includes roles as Vice President of Catholic Social Services, Program Director of the Edmonton Social Planning Council, small business owner of a private social work practice, and  social worker at the Glenrose Hospital. He was most recently employed as a tenured instructor at the University of Calgary in the Faculty of Social Work at the Edmonton division before being elected in May 2015.

He has volunteered with the Canadian Research Institute for Family and the Law as a board member, the Edmonton Community Adult Learners Association as the Board President; the Professional Social Work Education Board as a board member and the Public Education Committee as a member.

Political career
On May 14, 2013, Feehan publicly launched his campaign to represent Ward 10 on city council in the 2013 Edmonton municipal election. He ran on a platform of local sustainability and infrastructure renewal. He placed second in the 2013 civic election losing to community organizer Michael Walters.

In the fall of 2014 Feehan began campaigning for the NDP nomination in Edmonton-Rutherford. Feehan won the NDP nomination for the provincial riding of Edmonton-Rutherford on Wednesday, November 5. On May 5, 2015, Feehan was elected as the NDP MLA for Edmonton-Rutherford recording the highest voter increase for any party candidate across the province giving the NDP a 55.9% increased in the share of the vote in Edmonton-Rutherford since the 2012 general Alberta Election. It was announced on June 3 that Feehan would act as the NDP’s caucus chair. On June 12, 2015, members of Alberta’s Legislative Assembly elected Feehan deputy chairman of committees.

On February 2, 2016, Feehan was appointed Minister of Indigenous Relations, a renamed ministry which deals with the relationship between government and Indigenous nations. The day he was elected he stated that he was "very privileged" to serve in what he calls "a fundamentally important role in the province" referring to the portfolio he would take on as Minister of Indigenous Relations. In Feehan's time in the ministry he helped allocate 35-million $ to help Indigenous communities address climate change, focused on the province's role in the National Inquiry into Missing and Murdered Indigenous Women and Girls, participated in consultations with Indigenous and Métis communities that culminated in 2018 with the Alberta government's apology for its role in the Sixties Scoop, instituted training on Indigenous history and culture for all provincial civil servants in June 2018, among other issues.

Feehan was re-elected in the 2019 Alberta general election and was appointed to be the Official Opposition's Indigenous relations critic.

In April 2022, Feehan announced he would not seek re-election in the 2023 election.

Electoral record

Edmonton municipal election 2013

2015 Alberta general election

2019 Alberta general election

References

1960s births
Alberta New Democratic Party MLAs
Living people
Politicians from Edmonton
21st-century Canadian politicians